NBC Presents: Short Story was a half-hour program offering dramatizations of contemporary American short stories by famed writers such as William Faulkner, F. Scott Fitzgerald and Shirley Jackson.

Broadcasting from Hollywood, the series premiered February 21, 1951 on NBC with an adaptation of "Fifty Grand" by Ernest Hemingway. Script editor for the series was Hugh Kemp, who supervised scripts by George Lefferts, Ernest Kinoy and others. The series was first heard on Wednesdays at 10:30pm EST and then moved May 4 to Fridays at 8:00pm. Featuring stories by Conrad Aiken ("Silent Snow, Secret Snow"), Sherwood Anderson, Stephen Vincent Benét, Ring Lardner and John Steinbeck, the first series continued until July 13. The dramas were directed by Andrew C. Love. Overall supervision of production was by Margaret Cuthbert and Wade Arnold. Lamont Johnson, Don Stanley and John Wald were the announcers.

Second series
Moving to Fridays at 9:30pm EST, the second series ran from November 23, 1951 to March 14, 1952 with William Welch as script editor and Wade Arnold as executive producer. The College by Radio plan was discontinued. Stories in the second series were by Benét, Ray Bradbury ("The Rocket"), James M. Cain, Erskine Caldwell. John Cheever, Anton Chekhov, John Galsworthy, Graham Greene, Lardner, Steinbeck, Frank Stockton, Ben Ames Williams and others.

Third series
The third series ran from April 11 to May 30, 1952 with stories by Nell Bell, John Collier ("De Mortuis"), Eric Knight, William Daniel Steele, James Street, James A. Michener and James Thurber,

Brooklyn College cooperated with NBC by scheduling a literary appreciation course with a Short Story tie-in. This was part of NBC's College by Radio plan.

Cast members included Parley Baer, Jeff Corey, Howard Culver, John Dehner, Georgia Ellis, Paul Frees, Virginia Gregg, Jack Kruschen, Dan O'Herlihy and Barney Phillips.

Similar programs
There were several related shows that also offered literary adaptations: Best Plays (1952–53), Short Short Stories and The World's Great Novels (1944–48). With "the best published short shorts... originals by famous authors", Short Short Stories was a 15-minute daytime drama series which aired three days a week.

References

Listen to
Internet Archive: NBC Short Story

External links
Jerry Haendiges Vintage Radio Logs
A Guide to Supernatural Fiction: John Collier

1950s American radio programs
Plays based on short fiction
NBC radio programs